The Princess with the Golden Star is a 1959 Czech fairy tale fantasy film written and directed by Martin Frič.

Plot
A beautiful princess Lada was born with a golden star on her forehead. Her father the king Hostivít wants her to marry an evil and wealthy king Kazisvět VI, but Lada refuses. The princess dresses up in a fur coat made of mouse fur and runs away.

Cast
 Marie Kyselková as Princess Lada
 František Smolík as King Hostivít
 Martin Růžek as King Kazisvět VI
 Stanislav Neumann as Chef
 Theodor Pištěk as Counsellor
 Josef Vinklář as Cook Janek
 Josef Zíma as Prince Radovan
 Jarmila Kurandová as Nanny

References

External links
 

1959 films
1950s fantasy films
Czech fantasy films
Czechoslovak fantasy films
1950s Czech-language films
Films directed by Martin Frič
Films based on fairy tales
Plays adapted into films
1950s Czech films